Lille Kari Rock is an insular rock  high which lies  northwest of Cape Lollo on the island of  Bouvetøya  in the South Atlantic Ocean. It was charted from the ship Norvegia in December 1927 by a Norwegian expedition under Captain Harald Horntvedt, and was named by Horntvedt in association with Store Kari Rock which lies  westward.

References

Rock formations of Bouvet Island